WWRU (1660 kHz) is a commercial AM radio station licensed to Jersey City, New Jersey, broadcasting to the New York metropolitan area.  It airs Korean language talk and music shows, with the studios in Manhattan.

WWRU broadcasts at 10,000 watts around the clock, using a directional antenna.  With so few stations broadcasting on 1660 in the AM expanded band, at night, WWRU's signal can reportedly be heard as far south as the Washington metropolitan area and as far north as Southern Ontario.  The transmitter is off Paterson Plank Road in Carlstadt, New Jersey.

History

WWRU originated as the expanded band "twin" of an existing station on the standard AM band.

In 1979, a World Administrative Radio Conference (WARC-79) adopted "Radio Regulation No. 480", which stated that "In Region 2, the use of the band 1605-1705 kHz by stations of the broadcasting service shall be subject to a plan to be established by a regional administrative radio conference..." As a consequence, on June 8, 1988 an ITU-sponsored conference held at Rio de Janeiro, Brazil adopted provisions, effective July 1, 1990, to extend the upper end of the Region 2 AM broadcast band, by adding ten frequencies which spanned from 1610 kHz to 1700 kHz. The agreement provided for a standard transmitter power of 1 kilowatt, which could be increased to 10 kilowatts in cases where it did not result in undue interference.

While the Federal Communications Commission (FCC) was still making U.S. preparations to populate the additional frequencies, known as the AM expanded band, a provision was added to the Communications Act of 1934 in late 1991 which mandated that priority for assignments would be given to existing daytime-only stations that were located in a community with a population over 100,000, and which also did not have any full-time stations. Taking advantage of this provision, on December 8, 1995 WJDM in Elizabeth, New Jersey, became the first station in the country to begin regular broadcasting on the expanded band, assigned to 1660 kHz. Initially, AM 1660 carried the same WJDM call letters as its parent station.

On March 17, 1997 the FCC completed the process of determining which stations would be permitted to move to the expanded band frequencies, and WJDM was included among the eighty-eight selected, now formally authorized to move from 1530 to 1660 kHz. After more than two years of operation in the expanded band as WJDM, a construction permit for the 1660 station was assigned the call letters WBAH on May 11, 1998. The calls were changed to WWRU on February 15, 1999. The FCC's initial policy was that both the original station and its expanded band counterpart could operate simultaneously for up to five years, after which owners would have to turn in one of the two licenses, depending on whether they preferred the new assignment or elected to remain on the original frequency, although this deadline was extended multiple times. WJDM ceased broadcasting on January 30, 2019, and its license was cancelled April 10, 2020.

AM 1660 launched on December 8, 1995, and Radio AAHS network children's programming debuted on February 1, 1996, which lasted until 1997, with the station acting as the network's New York City owned and operated affiliate. Until other stations were licensed on the frequency and adjacent channels in other parts of the country in subsequent years, WJDM could be heard at night throughout the eastern U.S. and Canada.

When AAHS' parent company, Children's Broadcasting Corporation, discontinued the format in January 1998, the ten CBC-owned stations, including WJDM, began airing Beat Radio, a club dance music format, every night between 7pm and 7am while a random mix of music was broadcast during the day. In June 1998, the young Radio Unica network entered into a Limited Marketing Agreement (LMA) with CBC and began airing its own Spanish talk programming, including World Cup Soccer and many New York Yankees games. Radio Unica announced an agreement to purchase the station in October 1998 and the transaction was completed on January 14, 1999.

WWRU later changed its community of license to Jersey City, New Jersey. Multicultural Broadcasting purchased WWRU in December 2003.  The station then leased the time to Radio Seoul, which had just left WNSW/1430 in an effort to gain a stronger signal in the market.  Sister station WZRC, which had broadcast in Korean, switched to Chinese language at the same time.

Later, the brand changed from Radio Seoul to K-Radio, which it's called to this day.

References

External links

Korean-American culture in New Jersey
WRU
Mass media in Hudson County, New Jersey
Korean-language radio stations in the United States
Multicultural Broadcasting stations
Radio stations established in 1995
1995 establishments in New Jersey